Timothy J. "Tim" Gragert (born February 26, 1959) is an American politician serving as a member of the Nebraska Legislature from the 40th district. Elected in November 2018, he assumed office on January 9, 2019.

Early life and education 
Gragert was born and raised in Creighton, Nebraska. He graduate from Creighton Community High School in 1977 and earned a Bachelor of Science degree in natural resources from the University of Nebraska–Lincoln in 1985.

Career 
Gragert served in the United States Air Force from 1977 to 1981. He was then a fireman in the Nebraska Air National Guard from 1982 to 1985 and a helicopter pilot in the Nebraska Army National Guard. He also served in the Natural Resources Conservation Service. Gragert was elected to the Nebraska Legislature in November 2018 and assumed office on January 9, 2019. During his first year in the legislature, he authored legislation to create the Healthy Soils Task Force. Gragert will not seek re-election in 2022.

References 

1959 births
Living people
People from Creighton, Nebraska
Nebraska National Guard personnel
Republican Party Nebraska state senators
University of Nebraska–Lincoln alumni